Michael Boudin (born November 29, 1939) is a former United States circuit judge of the United States Court of Appeals for the First Circuit. He served as Chief Judge of that court from 2001 to 2008. Before his service on the First Circuit, he was a United States District Judge of the United States District Court for the District of Columbia. He was elected to the American Philosophical Society in 2010.

Early life and education

Boudin was born in New York City, the son of poet Jean (Roisman) Boudin and the civil liberties attorney Leonard Boudin, and older brother of Weather Underground member Kathy Boudin. He received a Bachelor of Arts degree from Harvard University and a Bachelor of Laws from Harvard Law School in 1964. He was a law clerk for Judge Henry J. Friendly of the United States Court of Appeals for the Second Circuit from 1964 to 1965, and then clerked for Justice John Marshall Harlan II of the Supreme Court of the United States from 1965 to 1966.

Legal career

From 1966 to 1987 Boudin  practiced regulatory law at Covington & Burling, a Washington, D.C. law firm. He spent 21 years at Covington & Burling, primarily drafting appellate briefs in complex regulatory matters for corporate clients. He worked as a visiting professor at Harvard Law School from 1982 to 1983, and then as a lecturer there from 1983 to 1998. He then served in President Reagan's Justice Department as a deputy assistant United States Attorney General of the Antitrust Division from 1987 to 1990.

Federal judicial service

On May 18, 1990, President George H. W. Bush nominated Boudin to the United States District Court for the District of Columbia, to a seat vacated by John H. Pratt. He was confirmed by the United States Senate on August 3, 1990, and received his commission on August 7, 1990. Boudin served on the District Court for about 18 months, but resigned on January 31, 1992 to return to Massachusetts. 

Two months later, on March 20, 1992, President Bush nominated Boudin to an appellate judgeship on the United States Court of Appeals for the First Circuit, headquartered in Boston, to the seat vacated when Judge Levin H. Campbell assumed senior status. He was confirmed by the Senate on May 21, 1992, and received his commission on May 26, 1992. Boudin served as Chief Judge of the First Circuit from 2001 to 2008. He assumed senior status on June 1, 2013. He retired from service on December 15, 2021.

See also 
 List of law clerks of the Supreme Court of the United States (Seat 9)
 Louis B. Boudin
 Leonard Boudin
 Kathy Boudin
 Chesa Boudin

References

External links

1939 births
20th-century American judges
20th-century American Jews
Harvard Law School alumni
Harvard Law School faculty
Judges of the United States Court of Appeals for the First Circuit
Judges of the United States District Court for the District of Columbia
Law clerks of the Supreme Court of the United States
Living people
United States court of appeals judges appointed by George H. W. Bush
United States district court judges appointed by George H. W. Bush
People associated with Covington & Burling
Boudin family
Members of the American Philosophical Society
21st-century American Jews